The mixtured pygmy frog (Microhyla mixtura) is a species of frog in the family Microhylidae.
It is endemic to China.
Its natural habitats are temperate grassland, subtropical or tropical dry lowland grassland, rivers, intermittent freshwater marshes, and irrigated land. It is not considered threatened by the IUCN.

References

Microhyla
Taxonomy articles created by Polbot
Amphibians described in 1966